Hugo Donais (born October 14, 1983) is a Canadian retired cyclist who specialized in downhill mountain biking, four-cross and BMX.

Donais was born in Laval, Quebec, and grew up in nearby Terrebonne. He began racing competitively in 1995 and turned professional in 2001, the same year he won the Junior Canada Cup Series. Donais spent much of his professional career with the Norco Factory Team and was twice selected as a member of the Canadian national cycling team.

During his professional career Donais starred in several cycling-related films and television programs, including Full Throttle, ES2 – Fully Loaded and episodes of Ride Guide.

UCI career

Donais represented Canada twice at the UCI Mountain Bike & Trials World Championships, in 2001 as a junior and in 2003 in the Elite category. He also competed in several UCI Mountain Bike World Cup events between 2002 and 2004.

Retirement

Donais retired from competitive cycling in 2005 and moved to British Columbia the following year. Since 2007 he has pursued a career in financial planning.

Palmares 

1999
 3rd Overall MTB Nationals Downhill - Cadet Expert Men
2001
 1st Overall  Mountain Bike Downhill Canada Cup Series - Junior
 1st Overall  Quebec Cup - Elite
 22nd Overall UCI Mountain Bike & Trials World Championships- Junior
2002
 1st Overall  Quebec Championship
 9th Overall Canada Cup Series
2003
 1st Overall  Calgary Canada Cup
 2nd Overall Canada Cup Downhill National Series
1st Stage 1
 2nd Overall Toronto International Bike Show BMX Pro Dual
 1st Overall  Quebec Championship
 72nd Overall UCI Mountain Bike & Trials World Championships
2004
 2nd Overall Toronto International Bike Show BMX Pro Dual 
 4th Overall Canada Cup Series
2005
 2nd Overall Canadian BMX Eastern National Series
 5th Overall UCI Crabtree BMX International
 1st Overall  Quebec Championship 4-Cross

References

External links
 Hugo's website
 Hugo on Facebook

1983 births
Canadian male cyclists
Canadian mountain bikers
Downhill mountain bikers
Four-cross mountain bikers
Living people
Sportspeople from Laval, Quebec